Shanaz Gulzar is a British visual artist. She specialises in stage design and digital and installation work and has been a producer at the Manchester International Festival.

She was born in Keighley, West Yorkshire, and gained a degree in fine art at Leeds Metropolitan University in 1995.

She starred in the 2019 BBC Four series Yorkshire Walks, where she walked in scenic areas with a 360 degree selfie-stick to record her surroundings. She is an associate artist of the National Theatre Wales.

In 2020 she was appointed to lead Bradford's bid to become the UK City of Culture in 2025; the bid was successful.

References

External links

Year of birth missing (living people)
Living people
British women artists
People from Keighley
Alumni of Leeds Beckett University
21st-century British artists
21st-century British women artists